Bracharoa is a genus of moths in the subfamily Lymantriinae. The genus was erected by George Hampson in 1905.

Species include: 
 Bracharoa bistigmigera
 Bracharoa charax
 Bracharoa dregei
 Bracharoa impunctata
 Bracharoa paupera
 Bracharoa quadripunctata
 Bracharoa ragazzii
 Bracharoa reducta

References

Lymantriinae